Sheshan, formerly known as Zose, is a pair of hills in Songjiang District in western Shanghai, China. The area around the two hills is a forest park.

Basilica 
It is surmounted by the Our Lady of China Catholic church, Sheshan Basilica, which was built there between 1922 and 1936 following the establishment of a chapel in 1867, soon replaced by a first church in 1871-1873 by French missionaries. Services in the church are held in Latin. The road to the top of Sheshan hill represents the stations of the cross Via Dolorosa (The Way of Suffering) that Christ took to his crucifixion. Every May pilgrims flock to the chapel and the holy road by the hundreds.

Observatory 

The hill also houses an observatory founded in 1900 by Jesuits, the Sheshan Observatory. In addition to scientific equipment of the modern era, it displays  a replica of a Han dynasty earthquake monitoring device, consisting of a jar with dragon heads mounted around the outside and a pendulum inside. Each dragon has a steel ball in its mouth. When an earthquake occurred, the pendulum would swing, knock a dragon causing its mouth to open and a ball to drop out thereby indicating the quake's direction.

Transportation 
Sheshan is in the vicinity of Sheshan Station on Line 9 of the Shanghai Metro.

See also
 Sheshan Golf Club

References

Landforms of Shanghai
Hills of China